Insaan is a 1982 Indian Hindi-language action drama film, produced by Ved Khanna Mukesh Movies and directed by Narendra Bedi. It stars Vinod Khanna, Jeetendra, Reena Roy  and music composed by Laxmikant–Pyarelal. Kishore Jariwala, brother of Bollywood actor Sanjeev Kumar, plays the role of an ex-soldier. The movie was among the last movies of Vinod Khanna before he took a hiatus from the Hindi film industry to join Rajneeshpuram in Oregon, USA.

Plot
Shankar is a self-starter who is scorned and expelled from the family by his virago stepmother. However, he well-earns with his hard work and lives buoyant with his wife Sona and a child Munna. By this time, his heinous stepbrothers Narendra Singh, Roop, & Pardhu spoil their share. So, they plot to grab Shankar's property and heir a malign Sher Singh to eliminate him, and he announces him as dead. Knowing it, Sona attempts suicide when she is rescued by an altruistic Ravi. Later, it becomes convenient for Sona protects herself from the clutches of her family, and also retrieve the property. Then, the blackguards besmirch the illicit relationships between them. So, to provide legitimacy to Sona & Munna Ravi marries her. Years roll by, and Ravi is tied to his family and dotes on Munna, but Sona stays far from him. Now, surprisingly Shankar returns alive. Being aware of the status quo, he remains silent in gratitude to Ravi. Here, learning the existence of Shankar Sona rushes to him and affirms the actuality which is overheard by Ravi. Meanwhile, Sher Singh and 3 brutal brothers abduct Munna. At last, Shankar & Ravi cease them when Ravi is severely injured while guarding Munna. Finally, the movie ends with Ravi leaving his breath reuniting Shankar & Sona.

Cast
Vinod Khanna as Shankar
Jeetendra as Ravi
Reena Roy as Sona
Amjad Khan as Sher Singh "Sheroo"
Karan Dewan as Thakur 
Narendra Nath as Thakur Narendra Singh 
Sudhir as Pardhu 
Roopesh Kumar as Roopa 
Asit Sen as Villager
Viju Khote as Girdhar
Jayshree T. as Villager
Birbal as Ravi's servant
Amrit Pal as Sheroo's goon
Aruna Irani as Dancer 
Keshto Mukherjee as Seth Ji
Kishore Jariwala as Subedaar Saheb
Master Sameer as Munna

Soundtrack
The music of the film is composed by Laxmikant-Pyarelal, with the lyrics by Anand Bakshi.
The film features the song "Saathiya, Tu Mere Sapnon Ka Meet Hai", sung by Mohammed Rafi and Asha Bhosle.

External links

1980s Hindi-language films
1982 films
Films directed by Narendra Bedi
Films scored by Laxmikant–Pyarelal